Massachusetts Senate's Worcester and Middlesex district in the United States is one of 40 legislative districts of the Massachusetts Senate. It covers 0.6% of Middlesex County and 18.7% of Worcester County population in 2010. Democrat John Cronin of Lunenberg has represented the district since 2021.

Locales represented
The district includes the following localities:
 Berlin
 Bolton
 Clinton
 Fitchburg
 Gardner
 Lancaster
 Leominster
 Lunenburg
 Sterling
 Townsend
 Westminster

Senators 
 Louis Peter Bertonazzi, circa 1985 
 Robert A. Antonioni, circa 2002 
 Jennifer Flanagan, 2009-2017
 Dean Tran, December 6, 2017-January, 2021 
John Cronin, 2021-current.

See also
 List of Massachusetts Senate elections
 List of Massachusetts General Courts
 List of former districts of the Massachusetts Senate
 Other Worcester County districts of the Massachusett Senate: 1st, 2nd; Hampshire, Franklin and Worcester; Middlesex and Worcester; Worcester, Hampden, Hampshire and Middlesex; Worcester and Norfolk
 Middlesex County districts of the Massachusetts House of Representatives: 1st, 2nd, 3rd, 4th, 5th, 6th, 7th, 8th, 9th, 10th, 11th, 12th, 13th, 14th, 15th, 16th, 17th, 18th, 19th, 20th, 21st, 22nd, 23rd, 24th, 25th, 26th, 27th, 28th, 29th, 30th, 31st, 32nd, 33rd, 34th, 35th, 36th, 37th
 Worcester County districts of the Massachusetts House of Representatives: 1st, 2nd, 3rd, 4th, 5th, 6th, 7th, 8th, 9th, 10th, 11th, 12th, 13th, 14th, 15th, 16th, 17th, 18th

References

External links

 Ballotpedia
  (State Senate district information based on U.S. Census Bureau's American Community Survey).
 

Senate 
Government of Middlesex County, Massachusetts
Government in Worcester County, Massachusetts
Massachusetts Senate